Kings of Crime is a 1988 Soviet crime film directed by Yuri Kara.

Plot 
The film tells about the confrontation between two leaders of criminal gangs from one coastal city.

Cast 
 Anna Samokhina as Rita
 Valentin Gaft as Artur
 Vladimir Steklov as Volodya
 Boris Shcherbakov as Andrei
 Arnis Licitis as Militia lieutenant (as Arnis Litsitis)
 Nurbey Kamkia as Rita's father
 Zinoviy Gerdt as Lawyer
 Gia Lejava as Ramzes (as Givi Lezhava)
 Amayak Akopyan
 Stanislav Korenev

References

External links 
 

1988 films
1980s Russian-language films
Soviet crime films
1980s crime films